William Wirt Dixon (June 3, 1838 – November 13, 1910) was a U.S. Representative from Montana.

Born in Brooklyn, New York, Dixon moved to Illinois in 1843 and to Keokuk, Iowa, in 1849.
Dixon pursued preparatory studies and studied law in Keokuk, and was admitted to the bar in 1858.  He moved to Tennessee in 1860, to Arkansas in the same year, to California in 1862, and then to Humboldt County, Nevada.  In 1866, Dixon moved to Montana, residing in Helena and later in Deer Lodge until 1879.  Dixon served as member of the Territorial house of representatives in 1871 and 1872.  After spending two years in the Black Hills, Dixon returned to Montana in 1881, settling in Butte and engaging in legal practice.  In 1884 and 1889, Dixon served as delegate to the constitutional conventions of Montana.

Dixon was elected as a Democrat to the Fifty-second Congress (March 4, 1891 – March 3, 1893).  Dixon unsuccessfully ran for reelection to the Fifty-third Congress.  Afterwards, he resumed his legal practice.  Dixon was also a candidate for election to the United States Senate, but the legislature failed to make a choice.

Dixon died in Los Angeles, California, November 13, 1910, was interred in Calvary Cemetery, East Los Angeles, and later reinterred in Rock Creek Cemetery, Washington, D.C., March 15, 1911.

References

1838 births
1910 deaths
People from Brooklyn
Politicians from Butte, Montana
Montana lawyers
Burials at Rock Creek Cemetery
Burials at Calvary Cemetery (Los Angeles)
Democratic Party members of the United States House of Representatives from Montana
19th-century American politicians
People from Keokuk, Iowa
People from Helena, Montana
People from Deer Lodge, Montana
19th-century American lawyers